Qingyi is a town in Fucheng District, Mianyang, Sichuan province, China. , it has 3 residential neighborhoods and 12 villages under its administration. 
Neighborhoods
Dengta Community
Longmen Community
Jinjialin Community

Villages
Yulong Village
Dalong Village
Mianxing Village
Qingyang Village
Xiaoqiao Village
Longfeng Village
Qianjin Village
Xiangji Village
Gejiamiao Village
Gulou Village
Daxin Village
Xiyuan Village

See also 
 List of township-level divisions of Sichuan

References 

Township-level divisions of Sichuan
Mianyang